The 2011 Campeonato Paulista de Futebol Profissional da Primeira Divisão - Série A1 (officially the Paulistão Chevrolet 2012 for sponsorship reasons) was the 110th season of São Paulo's top professional football league.

Santos won the title after beating Corinthians 2–1 on aggregate in the finals.

Format
The top eight teams in the First Stage qualifies to the Quarter-Finals. The bottom four teams will be relegated to the Série A2. Quarter and Semi-Finals will be played in one-legged matches.
The best-four teams not qualified to the Semi-Finals not from the city of São Paulo or Santos FC, will compete in the Campeonato do Interior.

Teams

First stage

League table

Results

Knockout stage

Bracket

Quarter-finals

Semi-finals

Finals

Campeonato do Interior

Semifinals

Finals

Statistics

Top goalscorers

Source: UOL Esporte
Last updated: 15 May 2012

Hat-tricks

1 Player scored 5 goals.

Awards

Team of the year

Player of the Season
The Player of the Year was awarded to Neymar.

Young Player of the Season
The Young Player of the Year was awarded to Lucas.

Countryside Best Player of the Season
The Countryside Best Player of the Year was awarded to Fábio Santos.

Top scorer of the Season
The Top scorer award went to Liédson and Elano, who scored 11 goals.

Coach of the Season
The Coach of the Season award went to Luiz Felipe Scolari.

Overall table

References

Campeonato Paulista seasons
Paulista